Lone Star College (LSC) is a public community college system serving the northern portions of the Greater Houston, Texas, area. In 2017 it enrolled about 95,000 students. The headquarters of the Lone Star College System are located in The Woodlands and in unincorporated Montgomery County, Texas.

History
 
The voters of the Aldine, Spring, and Humble school districts created North Harris County College in 1972 and opened the college for classes in 1973.

The district expanded in 1991 to cover neighboring Montgomery County and adopted the new name of
North Harris Montgomery Community College District.

As the district expanded to include areas outside north Harris and Montgomery Counties, the Board of Trustees decided the District's current name did not adequately define the service area, plus it was hard to remember and was quite lengthy.  During the first semester of the 2007 - 2008 school year, trustees initiated a name-change process using an online voting system; among the options was the name Lone Star College System which was offered as 1) two of the colleges (Lone Star College–North Harris and Lone Star College–Montgomery) already included the name and 2) the 75th Texas Legislature adopted HR1123, recognizing Montgomery County as the birthplace of the Flag of Texas, known for its lone star which serves as the state motto. 

The name Lone Star College System was selected by those voting, and on November 1, 2007, the Board of Trustees officially approved Lone Star College System as the District's new name. The Lone Star College logo, known as "The Star of Tomorrow," was designed by Houston advertising agency Richards/Carlberg.

LSC Bond History
 November 4, 2014
Voters went to the polls on November 4, 2014, and approved the $485 million bond referendum for Lone Star College, which will be used to create more learning facilities and opportunities. The referendum passed garnering 65% of the vote.
 May 11, 2013
A $497.7 million bond referendum proposed by Lone Star College System has fallen short of voter approval. With all precincts reporting across Harris and Montgomery counties, 55.6% of voters voted against the bond and only 44.4% favored it.
 May 10, 2008
Lone Star College called and approved a $420 million bond election for May 10, 2008, which was approved by voters getting 62% of the vote. LSCS last attempt to pass more than $200 million in the bond election of November 2006 failed.

2013 campus violence

On January 22, 2013, the north Harris County campus was put on lockdown for a shooting where at least three people were shot. All were taken to a local hospital with gunshot wounds. The shooting occurred outside the library and learning lab. A Harris County deputy sheriff said, "We found that the incident was not an active shooter incident, but was an altercation between two individuals."

Three months later, on April 9, 2013, the Cy-Fair campus and seven other schools in the area were put on lockdown when a student named Dylan Quick started stabbing outside the science lab and soon went through other buildings. Authorities were notified of the incident at 11:12 a.m., but the campus wasn't notified until just a minute after. As authorities arrived, Quick had already been chased down and subdued in the parking lot by four fellow students and was soon taken away. A total of sixteen people were injured, two of them critically and four of them seriously; all survived. Quick was charged with one count of attempted murder and two charges of aggravated assault. In December 2015, he was sentenced to 48 years in prison for the attack. He is eligible for parole in 2039.

Board of Trustees
The Lone Star College System Board of Trustees is responsible for ensuring that the Lone Star College System is an integral part of their communities and serves their needs. The board members do not do the work of the college; rather it establishes a vision for the work through the policies it sets.

All board members represent Lone Star College as residents within the LSCS District and serve without remuneration or emolument of office except where benefits are provided by state law. Board members are elected as representatives of nine single-member districts by citizens in the Lone Star College in-district service area in November of even-numbered years and serve terms of six years each.

Academics
In Fall 2020, the college will begin offering some four-year programs in Bachelor of Applied Technology in Cybersecurity, Bachelor of Science, Nursing (RN to BSN transition program), and Bachelor of Applied Science in Energy, Manufacturing, & Trades Management degrees after approval from the Southern Association of Colleges and Schools Commission on Colleges.

Accreditations
Lone Star College is accredited by the Southern Association of Colleges and Schools Commission on Colleges to award associate and baccalaureate degrees.
 Program Specific Accreditations:
 Construction programs at LSC-North Harris are accredited by the National Center for Construction Education and Research (NCCER).
 The Nursing program is approved by the ⦁	Texas Board of Nursing and is accredited by the Accreditation Commission for Education in Nursing (ACEN).
 The Occupational Therapy program is accredited by the Accreditation Council for Occupational Therapy Education (ACOTE) of the American Occupational Therapy Association (AOTA).
 The Oil & Gas Drilling Floorhand-Roustabout program is accredited by the International Association of Drilling Contractors Gateway™ Program.
 The Pharmacy Technician Training program at LSC-Tomball is accredited by the American Society of Health-System Pharmacists (ASHP), effective since October 2006.
 The Surgical Technology program at LSC-Tomball is accredited by the Commission on Accreditation of Allied Health Education Programs (CAAHEP).
 The Veterinary Technology program at LSC-Tomball is accredited by the American Veterinary Medical Association and students are eligible to take all State and National Board examinations to become a licensed veterinary technician (LVT) in Texas to work in all areas of animal health care.

Service Area and Locations

Service Area
As defined by the Texas Legislature, the service area of LSCS includes territory within the following school districts:

 Aldine Independent School District
 Cleveland Independent School District (*)
 Conroe Independent School District
 Cypress-Fairbanks Independent School District
 Humble Independent School District
 Huntsville Independent School District (*)
 Klein Independent School District
 Magnolia Independent School District
 Montgomery Independent School District (*)
 New Caney Independent School District
 New Waverly Independent School District (*)
 Splendora Independent School District
 Spring Independent School District
 Tarkington Independent School District (*)
 Tomball Independent School District
 Willis Independent School District

(*) The district is included in the service area by state law but is not part of the tax base.

Locations

Colleges & Centers

Lone Star College–CyFair (uninc. Harris County)  LSC–CyFair college, opened in May 2002. LSC-CyFair has two centers. The library is a joint project between LSC and the Harris County Public Library.
 Campus Centers: 
 The LSC-Cypress Center;
 The LSC-Westway Park Technology Center. 
 Featured programs:
 Logistics Management
 Echocardiography
 Networking
 Engineering Technology
 Petroleum Field Service Technician
 Machining Technology
 Welding Technology
 Visual Communication

 Lone Star College–Houston North (uninc. inside Beltway 8)  LSC-Houston North college, opened in 2019, is located in three existing satellite locations and one new in the surrounding Beltway 8 region of the Lone Star College service area. 
 Satellite Locations: 
 LSC-Houston North Fairbanks
 LSC-Houston North Greenspoint
 LSC-Houston North Victory;
 LSC-Houston North Fallbrook.
 Featured Programs:
 Energy, Manufacturing & Construction, and the Engineering, Mathematics, & Sciences area of study.
 Business & Professional Services area of study.  
 Energy, Manufacturing, & Construction, and Public Safety & Human Services areas of study, Associate of Arts with a focus of study in Criminal Justice, and certificates in Welding Technology and Heating, Ventilation and Air Conditioning (HVAC). 
 Arts, Humanities, Communication and Design, and Computer/Digital Technology areas of study and an Associate of Arts in Teaching.

Lone Star College–Kingwood (Houston)  LSC-Kingwood college, opened in 1984, is located at U.S. Highway 59 and Kingwood Drive in the northeast sector of Lone Star College’s territory. LSC-Kingwood additionally has three off-site centers. 
 High School Campuses: Cleveland High School and Atascocita High School.
 Campus Centers: 
 LSC-Atascocita Center;
 LSC-Process Technology Center.
 Featured Programs:
 Nursing
 Fire Science
 Engineering
 Game Design and Simulation
 Dental Hygiene
 Cosmetology
 Men’s, Women’s, and Intercultural Centers
 The Center for Civic Engagement
 Occupational Therapy
 Process Technology
 Continuing Education

Lone Star College–Montgomery (uninc. Montgomery County)  LSC-Montgomery college, opened in 1992, located between the Woodlands and Conroe areas.
 Campus Centers: 
 The LSC-Conroe Center, opened in 2011, a two-story facility located off FM 3083, Conroe Texas.
 The LSC-Magnolia Center, COMING SOON!.
 Featured Programs:
 Biotechnology
 Land Surveying & Mapping Technology
 Live Entertainment Technology (LET)
 Medical Radiologic Technology
 Nursing
 Physical Therapist Assistant
 Professional Pilot

Lone Star College–North Harris (uninc. Harris County)  LSC-North Harris college, opened in 1973, additionally has three centers, serving residents of the Aldine and Spring school districts.
 High School Campus: MacArthur High School
 Campus Centers:
 The LSC-East Aldine Center;
 The LSC-Health Professions Building;
 The CHI LSC-North Harris School of Cosmetology.
 The LSC-Transportation & Global Logistics Technology Center.
 The LSC-Construction and Skilled Trades Technology Center.
 Featured Programs:
 Visual Communication
 Welding Technology 
 Industrial Diesel Technology
 Paralegal Studies
 HVAC & R
 Massage Therapy
 Construction Supervision
 Electrical Technology
 Professional Truck Driver & Supply Chain Manager

Lone Star College-Online (Online)  LSC-Online college, added in 2022.

Lone Star College–Tomball (Tomball)  LSC-Tomball college, opened in 1988, additionally has two centers. The Lone Star College-Tomball Community Library is a joint project between LSC and the Harris County Public Library.
 High School Campuses: Magnolia West High School.
 Campus Centers:
 LSC-Tomball Health Science Building, opened in 2011, located near Tomball Regional Medical Center;
 LSC-Creekside Center, opened in 2016, located in the Creekside area of The Woodlands. 
 Featured Programs:
 Veterinary Technology
 Surgical Technology
 Pharmacy Technology
 Computer Networking Technology/Cisco
 Electrical Technology
 Petroleum Data Technology
 Art
 Business Administration
 CPA
 lifePATH® Program

Lone Star College-University Park (uninc. Harris County)  LSC-University Park college opened in December 2012. It is located in the former Compaq Computer’s world headquarters complex in northwest Houston. 
High School District: Klein Independent School District
 The Energy and Manufacturing Institute (EMI), was opened on May 14, 2014, and located on the campus of LSC-University Park, and specialized in high-tech workforce training in energy and manufacturing.
 Featured Programs:
 AAS in Accounting
 AAS in Visual Communication
 AS in Engineering
 AAS in Machining Technology
 AAS in Mechatronics Technician and AAS in Petroleum Fields Service Technician
 AA in Teaching
 AA in Music Field of Study

Lone Star College-University Centers

 Lone Star College–University Center at the Woodlands (The Woodlands, uninc. Montgomery County) Opened in 1998, located on the LSC-Montgomery college.

 The Lone Star College-University Center at LSC–University Park college (uninc. Harris County) Opened in the spring of 2010. The University Center is located in Building 12 at LSC-University Park.

 Lone Star College Bachelor's Degrees:
 Cybersecurity
 Nursing
 Energy, Manufacturing, and Trades Management

 University Partner Programs and Locations:
 Bellevue University
 Ferris State University
 Lamar University
 Sam Houston State University
 Springfield College
 Stephen F. Austin State University
 University of Houston-Downtown
 University of St. Thomas
 University of the Incarnate Word

Lone Star College-System Offices (Headquarters)

There are two locations for the Lone Star College-System Offices (headquarters). The first location is at The Woodlands The district moved to its current location on March 17, 2003. The second location is at Lone Star College-University Park, building 11. The administrative headquarters of the district were previously located in the Greenspoint district and in Houston in a building now known as Lone Star College-Houston North Greenspoint.

References

External links

 Official website

 
Education in Harris County, Texas
Education in Montgomery County, Texas
Universities and colleges accredited by the Southern Association of Colleges and Schools
Educational institutions established in 1973
1973 establishments in Texas
Two-year colleges in Texas